Jacob Marschak (23 July 1898 – 27 July 1977) was an American economist.

Life 
Born in a Jewish family of Kyiv, Jacob Marschak (until 1933 Jakob) was the son of a jeweler. During his studies he joined the social democratic Menshevik Party, becoming a member of the Menshevik International Caucus. In 1918 he was the labor minister in the Terek Soviet Republic. In 1919 he emigrated to Germany, where he studied at the University of Berlin and the University of Heidelberg.

From 1922 to 1926 he was a journalist, and in 1928 he joined the new Kiel Institut für Weltwirtschaft. With the gathering Nazi storm, he emigrated to England, where he went to Oxford to teach at the Oxford Institute of Statistics, which was funded by the Rockefeller Foundation, allowing him to emigrate in 1939 to the United States. After teaching at the New School for Social Research, in 1943 he went to University of Chicago, where he led the Cowles Commission. He followed the commission's move to Yale University, and he then became a professor at UCLA in 1960.

In 1972 he co-founded Team Theory with Roy Radner.

Marschak was fluent in approximately one dozen languages.  Shortly before he was due to become president of the American Economic Association, he died from a cardiac arrest.

UCLA sponsors the recurring Jacob Marschak Interdisciplinary Colloquium on Mathematics in the Behavior Sciences.

Major publications

Books

Chapters in books 
 
Translates as:

Journal articles 
 
 
 
 
 
 
 
 
 
 
  Pdf version.

Honours 
 1946 President of the Econometric Society
 1963 Honorary Fellow of the Royal Statistical Society
 1967 Distinguished Fellow of the American Economic Association

References

External links 
 Biography at HET
 Biography at Yale
Kenneth J. Arrow, "Jacob Marschak", Biographical Memoirs of the National Academy of Sciences (1991)

1898 births
1977 deaths
Jewish American scientists
Politicians from Kyiv
Fellows of the American Statistical Association
Members of the United States National Academy of Sciences
Soviet emigrants to Germany
Fellows of the Econometric Society
Presidents of the Econometric Society

Mensheviks
20th-century American writers
20th-century American economists
Soviet emigrants to the United States
Jewish emigrants from Nazi Germany to the United Kingdom
German emigrants to the United States
20th-century Ukrainian economists
Presidents of the American Economic Association
Distinguished Fellows of the American Economic Association
Jewish Ukrainian social scientists